The University of Strathclyde Technology and Innovation Centre (TIC) is a centre for technological research based in Glasgow, Scotland. The building, designed by BDP, is located on the John Anderson Campus's southern edge within the city centre's Merchant City district.

History
The TIC was funded by the European Regional Development Fund, the Scottish Government and the University of Strathclyde.

The work started on the triangular, nine-story, steel-framed building in March 2012, with a completion date set in 2014. The facility was built to Energy Performance Certificate (EPC) "A" rating standards. The  space can accommodate 1,200 workers. The building includes open-plan office spaces, three lecture theatres and areas for specialist laboratory equipment.

Besides the Technology and Innovation Centre, a  Industry Engagement Building, located nearby, accommodates 500 workers.

The research carried out at the centre by 850 researchers is focused on engineering, science, bio-nanotechnology, business, energy, health, technology and asset management.

References

http://www.strath.ac.uk/press/newsreleases/headline_625848_en.html
http://www.bbc.co.uk/news/uk-scotland-glasgow-west-18393607
http://www.theglaswegian.co.uk/glasgow-news/news/2012/02/22/strathclyde-university-gets-green-light-for-new-technology-and-innovation-centre-102692-23760926/
http://www.bbc.co.uk/news/uk-scotland-scotland-business-14768346

External links
 

Buildings and structures in Glasgow
2015 establishments in Scotland
Building Design Partnership buildings
Buildings and structures completed in 2015
Innovation in the United Kingdom
Research institutes in Scotland
University and college buildings in Scotland
Technology and Innovation Centre